Fox Lodge Cricket Club Ground is a cricket ground in Strabane, Northern Ireland.  It is the home of Fox Lodge Cricket Club of the North West Senior League. The first recorded match on the ground was in 1934, when Ireland played the Marylebone Cricket Club in a non first-class match.  In 2002, the ground hosted a Women's One Day International when Ireland women played India women, although no play was possible due to rain.

References

External links
Fox Lodge Cricket Club Ground at CricketArchive

Cricket grounds in Northern Ireland
Strabane
Sports venues in County Tyrone